The Piaggio P.XIX was an Italian aircraft engine produced by Rinaldo Piaggio S.p.A. during World War II and used to power aircraft of the Regia Aeronautica.

Development
The engine was part of a line of 14-cylinder radial engines developed from Piaggio based on the Gnome-Rhône Mistral Major, which was itself loosely based on the Bristol Jupiter. It was derived from the earlier P.XI but with a higher compression ratio.

Variants
P.XIX R.C.45 Turbine Geared, rated altitude 
P.XIX R.C.50 Geared

Applications
 CANT Z.1007ter
 Macchi MC.200bis prototype
 Reggiane Re.2002

The engine was also fitted experimentally to single versions of the IMAM Ro.57 and Savoia-Marchetti SM.82 (serial number MM.60591).

Specifications (R.C. 45 Turbine)

See also

References

External links
 Re.2002 manual entry for the P.XIX

1940s aircraft piston engines
Aircraft air-cooled radial piston engines
P.XIX